Echinosepala uncinata is a species of orchid plant native to Jamaica .

References 

uncinata
Flora of Jamaica
Flora without expected TNC conservation status